Molo is a genus of skippers in the family Hesperiidae. Small (wingspan about 25 millimeters), brown and orange smugglers. These species are quite variable, the species of brown and orange varies widely within a species, some individuals also have white spots instead of orange. As is common in Hesperiini, it is almost impossible to recognize the genus only on the outer appearance.

Species
Recognised species in the genus Molo include:
 Molo mango Guenée, 1865
 Molo pelta (Evans, 1955)

Former species
Molo calcarea Schaus, 1902 - transferred to Psoralis calcarea (Schaus, 1902)
Molo visendus (Bell, 1942) - transferred to Psoralis visendus (Bell, 1942)

References

Natural History Museum Lepidoptera genus database

Hesperiini
Hesperiidae genera